Bogusza   Bogusha; , Bohusha) is a village in southern Poland.

Geography
Bogusza is located in a mountain valley in the Lesser Poland Voivodeship, along a stream named the Królówka, in the county of Nowy Sącz.

History
The town was essentially de-populated after World War II in Operation Vistula in 1947.

Monuments
The town is the site of the wooden church of St. Demetrius, built in 1858.

Villages in Nowy Sącz County